In mathematics, a group is called elementary amenable if it can be built up from finite groups and abelian groups by a sequence of simple operations that result in amenable groups when applied to amenable groups.  Since finite groups and abelian groups are amenable, every elementary amenable group is amenable - however, the converse is not true.

Formally, the class of elementary amenable groups is the smallest subclass of the class of all groups that satisfies the following conditions:
it contains all finite and all abelian groups
if G is in the subclass and H is isomorphic to G, then H is in the subclass
it is closed under the operations of taking subgroups, forming quotients, and forming extensions
it is closed under directed unions.

The Tits alternative implies that any amenable linear group is locally virtually solvable; hence, for linear groups, amenability and elementary amenability coincide.

References

Infinite group theory
Properties of groups